Andrew Merchant (born February 10, 1978), is a former American college baseball coach.

Head coaching record

Junior college

College

References

External links
 Olivet profile

1978 births
Living people
Baseball pitchers
Alma Scots baseball players
Olivet Comets baseball coaches
Lansing Stars baseball coaches
Baseball players from Michigan